Madonna in Chains is a 1949 West German drama film directed by Gerhard Lamprecht and starring Lotte Koch, Karin Hardt and Elisabeth Flickenschildt.

It was shot in studios in Düsseldorf with location shooting took place in the surrounding region. The film's sets were designed by the art director Alfred Bütow.

Plot
A woman is wrongly accused of a crime that was really committed by her husband and is sent to jail. While in prison she gives birth and the child is put up for adoption. Once fresh evidence frees her from jail, the woman goes searching for her daughter.

Cast
Lotte Koch as Maria Randolf
Karin Hardt as Gerda Wienholt
Elisabeth Flickenschildt as Gabriele Custodis
Elise Aulinger as Nickel, mother
Dagmar Jansen as Christa, child
Richard Häussler as Professor Wienholt
Heinz Schorlemmer as Dr. Peter Gellert
Werner Hessenland as Randolf, general director
Rudolf Therkatz as Director Weigant
Willy Millowitsch as Prof. Kleinschmidt
Paul Heidemann as Dr. Klaussen
Elisabeth Botz
Frigga Braut as Supervisor Hansen
Emmy Graetz as Gertrud, gatekeeper
Hiltraud Helling
Renate Hofrichter
Alfons Godard
Carl Möller
Wilhelm Semmelroth
Hermann Weisse as Bertrich, warden

References

External links

1949 drama films
German drama films
West German films
Films directed by Gerhard Lamprecht
German black-and-white films
1940s German films
1940s German-language films